HD 131040 is a double star in the northern constellation of Boötes. The brighter component is a subgiant star that varies slightly in luminosity by 0.04 in magnitude. The magnitude 9.64 companion lies at an angular separation of 15.2″ along a position angle of 93°.

References

External links
 HR 5537
 CCDM J14495+5122
 Image HD 131040

Boötes
131040
Double stars
072508
F-type subgiants
5537
Durchmusterung objects